Close Up is a half-hour-long New Zealand current affairs programme produced by Television New Zealand. The programme aired at 7 pm weeknights (straight after One News) on TV ONE and was presented in its final years by Mark Sainsbury. The last edition was broadcast on 30 November 2012. Seven Sharp, a current affairs show aimed at a younger audience, took its place in 2013.

The new Close Up began broadcasting on 2 November 2004 as a replacement for the Holmes show immediately after Paul Holmes announced his resignation from TVNZ and that he would be presenting a similar show on Prime in 2005. The show was originally branded as Close Up at 7 using the existing Holmes studio; when the show relaunched in 2005, it was branded as simply Close Up with a new-look studio.

Close Up was hosted by Susan Wood from its first show in 2004 until 4 December 2006, when she resigned from TVNZ, citing health problems.

Close Up competed with the TV3 current affairs show Campbell Live, and shared the same time slot with TV2 drama Shortland Street.

Personnel

Presenters

Reporters
Gill Higgins
Robyn Janes
Daniel Faitaua
Hannah Ockelford
Matt Chisholm
Michael Holland
Corinne Ambler
Dominic Bowden (entertainment reporter)

Producers
Louisa Cleave
Katherine McCallum
Christopher Lynch
Mike Valintine (executive producer)

Major New Zealand awards

Robyn Janes, Louisa Cleave (producer) and Corinne Ambler won Best Current Affairs Reporting for a daily programme and the coveted Journalist of the Year awards at the 2009 Qantas Film & TV Awards. Robyn, Louisa and Corinne won for their series on the shocking state of two New Zealand schools - Wairoa's Tiaho Primary School and Whanganui Awa School. It was the second year in a row that Robyn has been recognised. She won the award for Best Current Affairs Reporting for a daily programme in 2008 as well.

Previous version
In the 1980s, Close Up was a weekly, hour-long current affairs' programme, looking more in depth into domestic news topics of the day, much in the mould of 60 Minutes.

Close Up cancellation
On 28 September 2012, TVNZ decided to cancel Close Up at the end of the year taking a new stance at the 7pm time slot. TVNZ head of news and current affairs Ross Dagan said "a new daily current affairs show with a distinctively different format." This also ended Mark Sainsbury's association with the state owned channel.

The show ended on 30 November 2012.

References

External links
TV ONE minisite
Final edition of Close Up

2000s New Zealand television series
2010s New Zealand television series
2004 New Zealand television series debuts
2012 New Zealand television series endings
New Zealand television news shows
TVNZ 1 original programming